Walker Brothers Limited was a manufacturer based in Pagefield Ironworks, Wigan, England. It produced ventilation equipment for mining, truck and bus chassis (under the "Pagefield" name), mobile cranes, and railway locomotives and railcars.

History
In 1886, John Scarisbrick Walker established Globe Foundry in Wigan. He was later joined by brothers Thomas and Edwin and the business renamed Walker Brothers. Initially based in Queen Street, it moved to Pagefield Works in 1874. It initially manufactured steam locomotives before diversifying in the 1930s to produce diesel locomotives and railcars. It closed in the early 1960s.

Products

Pagefield Trucks
Walker Brothers started building petrol trucks using the Pagefield name in 1907. At the Manchester Commercial Vehicle show of 1908 their 30-40cwt truck was the only petrol-drven commercial vehicle. In 1911 they announced 3 new models, 40 cwt, 50 cwt and 3 ton. All the trucks had four cylinder petrol engines built by Pagefield, and all had chain drive to the rear axle. In 1913 a Pagefield truck was revealed which had been designed to meet the requirements of the War Office Subsidy Scheme, this adopted the Dorman 4JO engine, and replaced the chain final drive with a live axle and propshaft. This model was certified under the scheme and when the war came, this meant Pagefield was one of the makers able to provide the War Office with approved vehicles which they provided throughout the war.

In 1920 Pagefield launched a new motor coach chassis, using a Dorman subsidy-type engine, claiming "You don't put Passengers on Freight Under-Carriages" - as it was not uncommon at the time to sell commercial chassis for either freight or passenger use.

An interesting new vehicle at the 1923 commercial vehicle show was a 3.5 ton Pagefield, with forward control, and a wheelbase of only 8 ft 2in. They were also developing their refuse collection wagons around 1923/1924, whereby horse drawn wagons collected from house and delivered to the Pagefield truck who took them to the local dump and returned for the next load.

In 1930 Pagefield introduced a 6-ton truck (the Pagefield NG) with a 4-cylinder Gardner diesel engine of 5.6 litres.

Walkers produced refuse wagons from the mid-1920s, and this became an important part of their product line. Launched in 1932, the Pagefield Prodigy was a refuse truck with forward control and a cab that could accommodate the crew. It was available either with a Gardner diesel engine, or a Meadows petrol engine. The body design has features owned by Country Commercials Cars Ltd, and in 1947 it formalised their long-standing business arrangement by forming Walkers and County Cars Ltd.

It also produced a 6-wheeler from 1933, called the Pegasix, using the Gardner 5LW diesel engine.

After the war a Pagefield 5-ton truck with Perkins P6 diesel engine designed for export was announced. Walker Bros dropped the use of the Pagefield trademark about this time, and a crane truck it built in the early 1950s was simply referred to as the Walker 6-ton crane.

Locomotives
CIE 501 Class: 3

Railcars
Between 1932 and 1953, Walker Brothers produced the following railcars:
Clogher Valley Railway, Ireland: 1
County Donegal Railways Joint Committee, Ireland: 8
Great Northern Railway, Ireland: 7
Emu Bay Railway, Australia: 1
São Paulo Railway Company, Brazil: 4
Sligo, Leitrim and Northern Counties Railway, Ireland: 1
Victorian Railways Walker railmotor: 64
Peruvian Corporation, Peru: 12
Coras Iompair Eireann, Ireland: 4
Cyrenaica Railways, Libya: 1

References

Companies based in Wigan
Rolling stock manufacturers of the United Kingdom
1886 establishments in England